Davalyn Cunningham is a former professional basketball player who played for the Orlando Miracle.

Rutgers statistics

Source

Personal life
Cunningham has a younger brother, Dante, who also played in the NBA

References

External links
WNBA.com: Davalyn Cunningham Player Info

1980 births
Living people
American women's basketball players
Basketball players from Washington, D.C.
Orlando Miracle players
Rutgers Scarlet Knights women's basketball players
Forwards (basketball)